James P. Covey (born March 7, 1944) is an American diplomat and politician. He was nominated to be the Assistant Secretary of State for South and Central Asian Affairs in April 1992, but the nomination was "not acted upon by the Senate."

He was born in Middletown, Connecticut.

References

Living people
1944 births
Politicians from Middletown, Connecticut